Toni Tiente Tiente (born 25 October 1997) is a Cameroonian professional footballer who plays as a midfielder for Atlanta United 2 in the USL Championship.

Career

Early career
Born in Cameroon, but raised in Paris, France, Tiente was part of the Paris FC academy team, appearing on the bench for the club's reserve team in the Championnat National 3 on two occasions in 2015.

In 2017, Tiente moved to the United States to play college soccer at Georgia Gwinnett College. In four seasons with the Grizzlies, Tiente made 70 appearances, scoring 21 goals and tallying 25 assists. He was also a 2020 NAIA and United Soccer Coaches All-America first team selection, set the program's single-season record with 11 assists during 2018 season, won two Association of Independent Institutions titles and helped the Grizzlies reach the Round of 16 at the NAIA national tournament in 2018 and 2019.

While at college, Tiente also appeared for NPSL side Georgia Revolution, where he made 23 appearances and scored three goals across 2018 and 2019. In 2019, he was named to the NPSL Region XI for the South Region.

Senior career
In 2022, Tiente played with UPSL side Kalonji Pro-Profile, before signing a short-term deal with USL Championship club Atlanta United 2 on 24 June 2022. On 19 July 2022, Atlanta made Tiente's move permanent.

International career
In 2014, Tiente was called up to the Cameroon under-20 side for the first time.

References

External links
Gwinnett College profile
Atlanta United profile

1997 births
Living people
Cameroonian expatriate footballers
Cameroonian expatriate sportspeople in the United States
Cameroonian footballers
Cameroon youth international footballers
Association football midfielders
Atlanta United 2 players
Footballers from Paris
National Premier Soccer League players
Paris FC players
USL Championship players
United Premier Soccer League players
Georgia Gwinnett Grizzlies men's soccer players